The Hamhung Grand Theatre (함흥대극장, 咸興大劇場) is a theatre located in Hamhung, North Korea. It is the largest theatre building in the country. 

The building is used for major live theatrical productions by the revolutionary opera troupe. The foyer inside features a large mural of the current leader Kim Jong-un and his father Kim Jong-Il.

The theatre was constructed in 1984.

See also

List of theatres in North Korea

References

External links
Hamhung Grand Theatre - Flickr set

1984 establishments in North Korea
Hamhung
Theatres completed in 1984
Theatres in North Korea
Buildings and structures in South Hamgyong Province
20th-century architecture in North Korea